OSJ may refer to:

Optical Society of Japan, a professional organization of physicists
Officer of the Order of the Star of Jordan, a military decoration of Jordan
Officer of the Venerable Order of Saint John, an order of chivalry
San José Observatory, an astronomy observatory in Buenos Aires, Argentina
Orchestra of St John's, a UK orchestra
Oblates of St. Joseph, a Catholic religious institute
Old San Juan, the historic colonial district of San Juan, Puerto Rico